The Reverend Jacob Duché (1737–1798) was a Rector of Christ Church in Philadelphia, Pennsylvania, and the first chaplain to the Continental Congress.

Biography

Duché was born in Philadelphia in 1737, the son of Colonel Jacob Duché, Sr., later mayor of Philadelphia (1761–1762) and grandson of Anthony Duché, a French Huguenot.  He was educated at the Philadelphia Academy and then in the first class of the College of Philadelphia (now the University of Pennsylvania), where he also worked as a tutor of Greek and Latin. After graduating as valedictorian in 1757, he studied briefly at Cambridge University before being ordained an Anglican clergyman by the Bishop of London and returning to the colonies.

In 1759 he married Elizabeth Hopkinson, sister of Francis Hopkinson, a signer of the Declaration of Independence. In 1768, he was elected to the American Society.

Duché first came to the attention of the First Continental Congress in September 1774, when he was summoned to Carpenters' Hall to lead the opening prayers.  Opening the session on the 7th of that month, he read the 35th Psalm, and then broke into extemporaneous prayer.

The prayer had a profound effect on the delegates, as recounted by John Adams to his wife.

On July 4, 1776, when the United States Declaration of Independence was ratified, Duché, meeting with the church's vestry, passed a resolution stating that the name of King George III of Great Britain was no longer to be read in the prayers of the church.  Duché complied, crossing out said prayers from his Book of Common Prayer, committing an act of treason against England, an extraordinary and dangerous act for a clergyman who had taken an oath of loyalty to the King. On July 9, Congress elected him its first official chaplain.

When the British occupied Philadelphia in September 1777, Duché was arrested by General William Howe and detained, underlining the seriousness of his actions. He was later released, and emerged as a Loyalist and propagandist for the British, at which time he wrote a famous letter to General George Washington, camped at Valley Forge, Pennsylvania, in which he begged him to lay down arms and negotiate for peace with the British.  Suddenly, Duché went from hero of the Revolutionary cause to outcast in the new United States. He was convicted of high treason to the State of Pennsylvania, and his estate was confiscated. In consequence, Duché fled to England, where he was appointed chaplain to the Lambeth orphan asylum, and soon made a reputation as an eloquent preacher. He was not able to return to America until 1792, after he had suffered a stroke.

On October 1, 1777, Congress appointed joint chaplains, William White, Duché's successor at Christ Church, and George Duffield, pastor of the Third Presbyterian Church of Philadelphia.

Duché died in 1798 in Philadelphia, where he is buried in St. Peter's churchyard.

His daughter, Elizabeth Sophia Duché (born on September 18, 1774, Philadelphia; died on December 11, 1808, Montréal), married Captain John Henry in 1799.  Henry was an Army officer and political adventurer who was indirectly instrumental in the declaration of war on Great Britain by the United States in 1812.

Citations

Sources

Further reading
 Dellape, Kevin J. America's First Chaplain: The Life and Times of the Reverend jacob Duché. Bethlehem, PA: Lehigh University Press, 2013.
 McBride, Spencer W. Pulpit and Nation: Clergymen and the Politics of Revolutionary America. Charlottesville: University of Virginia Press, 2016.
Gough, Deborah. Christ Church, Philadelphia. 1. Philadelphia: University of Pennsylvania, 1995.
Simpson, Henry, The Lives of Eminent Philadelphians, Now Deceased. Philadelphia: William Brotherhead, 1859.

External links
Biography and portrait at the University of Pennsylvania
Duché's letter to George Washington

History of Philadelphia
Clergy from Philadelphia
American Episcopal priests
University of Pennsylvania alumni
Clergy in the American Revolution
Continental Congress
Religion and politics
People of colonial Pennsylvania
Huguenot participants in the American Revolution
1737 births
1798 deaths
Burials at St. Peter's churchyard, Philadelphia